Giuliano Oberti (born 22 June 1901) was an Italian sailor. He competed at the mixed 6 metres at the 1928 and 1936 Summer Olympics.

References

External links

1901 births
Sportspeople from Genoa
Year of death missing
Place of death missing
Italian male sailors (sport)
Sailors at the 1928 Summer Olympics – 6 Metre
Sailors at the 1936 Summer Olympics – 6 Metre
Olympic sailors of Italy